is a Japanese actress, artist, and model. She is a former member of the Japanese idol group Nogizaka46. She has played lead roles in the 2015 film Eyes and the 2021 film It's a Summer Film, and supporting roles in the films Asahinagu and Kakegurui – Compulsive Gambler. Her performance in It's a Summer Film was nominated for a Hochi Film Award and a Mainichi Film Award.

Early life

Itō was born on February 20, 1996, in Osaka, Japan to a fashion designer mother and a graphic designer father. She began her entertainment career in 2011 by successfully auditioning for the first generation of Nogizaka46, an idol group created as the official rival of AKB48.

Career

Nogizaka46
As a Nogizaka46 member, Itō appeared in several albums, concerts, short films, music videos, and television shows, including the million-selling singles "Influencer" and "Itsuka Dekiru kara Kyō Dekiru". In 2017, at the group's sold-out first Tokyo Dome concert, Itō performed for the last time as a Nogizaka46 member. After formally leaving the group, Itō remained on the talent roster of Nogizaka46's management company.

Acting

Itō's acting career began while she was still a member of Nogizaka46. She had a minor part in the 2013 movie Bad Boys J, but her first major film role was in Eyes, an adaptation of a story by Ring author Koji Suzuki. In 2017 she played a supporting role in Asahinagu, an adaptation of the manga of the same name, for which she had to learn how to use the naginata. In 2019, Itō was cast in her first post-Nogizaka46 film role, winning a supporting role in Kakegurui – Compulsive Gambler, a film adaptation of the Homura Kawamoto manga of the same name. Later that year she played the role of Minatsu in the Kansai TV drama .

Itō's second lead role came in the 2021 film It's a Summer Film, in which she played Hadashi. Her performance earned a nomination for a Hochi Film Award for Best New Artist and a nomination for a Mainichi Film Award for Best New Actress, as well as a Best New Actress prize at the Tama Film Awards, which are part of the Tama Cinema Forum, a "people's choice film festival". The following year she appeared in supporting roles in the films To a More Transcendent Place and Sobakasu, and in several episodes of the Hikari TV series . She also took on the lead role of Kurumi Enomoto, a food truck owner, in TV Tokyo's , a drama produced as part of TV Tokyo's efforts to promote regional revitalization in Takasaki.

Art and modeling

While in Nogizaka46, Itō art directed and styled several of her individual performance videos, which were included in bonus versions of singles and DVDs. Shortly before her graduation from Nogizaka46, Itō's first solo art exhibition was held in October 2017 at GALLERY X BY PARCO and featured photographs of fellow Nogizaka46 members, a room filled with objects meant to represent the contents of Itō's brain, and an original short film playing on a loop. In 2017 she also filmed her first solo commercial, for the app リクポ ("requpo"), based on a character she created and played in a Nogizaka46 music video. In 2018, Itō's photobook Étranger, for which she styled the clothing, was published. She was also selected to be the image model for the MOOSIC LAB 2018 music and film festival. In 2019 her solo art exhibition "HOMESICK" was held at Parco Gallery X in Shibuya. Itō also appeared as the sole performer in a 2022 commercial for the candy Puregumi, directed by Santa Yamagishi, who had also directed Itō in To a More Transcendent Place.

Selected works

Films

Television

Solo art exhibitions 
 「伊藤万理華の脳内博覧会」, Gallery X by Parco, 2017
 「伊藤万理華の脳内博覧会」, Kyoto Nippon Festival, 2017
 “HOMESICK”, Parco Gallery X, 2019

Photobooks
 エトランゼ (Étranger), Shueisha, 2018,

Advertising
 "まりかっと" commercial, requpo, 2017
 "滑走路" commercial, Puregumi, 2022

Awards

References

1996 births
Living people
Japanese film actresses
Japanese female models
Japanese women artists
People from Osaka
Japanese idols
Japanese women singers
J-pop singers
Nogizaka46 members
Sony Music Entertainment Japan artists